Klezmorim can refer to:

Musicians who play klezmer, a style of music originating with the Ashkenazi Jews of Central and Eastern Europe
The Klezmorim, a klezmer band